Cofermentation may refer to;

 Cofermentation (biogas)
 Cofermentation (wine), the simultaneous fermentation of two varieties of grape in winemaking